Ardeth Lake is an alpine lake in Boise County, Idaho, United States, located high in the Sawtooth Mountains in the Sawtooth National Recreation Area. Ardeth Lake is most easily accessed from trailheads in the Sawtooth Valley, which are accessed from State Highway 75 or from the Grandjean trailhead to the northwest off of State Highway 21.

Ardeth Lake is in the central Sawtooth Wilderness, and wilderness permit can be obtained at trailheads.

See also
 List of lakes of the Sawtooth Mountains (Idaho)
 Sawtooth National Forest
 Sawtooth National Recreation Area
 Sawtooth Range (Idaho)

References

External links
Ardeth Lake Idaho Department of Fish and Game

Glacial lakes of the Sawtooth Wilderness
Glacial lakes of the United States
Lakes of Boise County, Idaho
Lakes of Idaho